is a Japanese manga series by Naru Narumi. It began serialization in Takeshobo's Manga Life Storia magazine in September 2013. A live-action drama series adaptation aired from June 2015 to December 2016. A 12-episode anime television series adaptation co-animated by Studio Gokumi and AXsiZ aired in Japan from January to March 2018.

Characters

Played by: Akari Hayami (2015 version), Hiyori Sakurada (2020 version)
Koizumi is an enigmatic, beautiful girl with pale skin who has recently moved into the neighborhood. Appearing mostly cold and antisocial, the only time her facade is broken is when ramen is involved; either when she consumes it with ravenous delight (when they sport unusual flavors), or when she shares her extensive knowledge about types and ways of preparation. She is fluent in German.

Played by: Karen Miyama (2015 version), Manami Igashira (2020 version)
Yū is a cheerful and optimistic girl who has developed an obsession for her new classmate Koizumi. When she discovers Koizumi's passion for ramen, she attempts to use this to get closer to her.

Played by: Seika Furuhata (2015 version), Ririka Tanabe (2020 version)
Misa is Yū's classmate, who initially becomes jealous of Yū's growing obsession for Koizumi. However, she is a lover of spicy foods, and she and Koizumi become sort-of-friends through this single common passion.

, Ayaka Imoto (2020 version)
Jun is the student representative of Koizumi, Yū and Misa's class who is very fastidious about her status. While she likes ramen, she has ceased consuming it in public after her glasses once fogged up while she ate some in the school cafeteria, until Koizumi manages to rekindle that lost delight.

Yū's older brother, he is a college student who works at Izakaya. Like his sister, he becomes interested in Koizumi, but initially remains unaware of Yū's passion for her.

Yū's older cousin who has been living in Osaka before recently moving to Tokyo.

Media

Manga
Ms. Koizumi Loves Ramen Noodles is written and illustrated by Naru Narumi. It began serialization in Takeshobo's Manga Life Storia magazine on September 30, 2013. The series is licensed by Dark Horse Comics for release in North America starting in September 2019. The series is also published in Taiwan by Kadokawa Media. Takeshobo published an anthology titled  on January 30, 2018.

Live-action drama
A four-episode live-action drama series, produced by Kyodo Television and directed by Tsukuru Matsuki, aired from June 27 to July 18, 2015 on Fuji TV. A New Year's special aired on January 4, 2016 and a New Year's Eve special aired on December 30, 2016. A third special aired on March 27, 2020 and a fourth special aired on January 8, 2022.

Anime
A 12-episode anime television series adaptation, co-produced by Studio Gokumi and AXsiZ, aired in Japan between January 4 and March 22, 2018 and was simulcast by Crunchyroll. The series was directed by Kenji Seto with scripts by Tatsuya Takahashi and character designs by Takuya Tani. The opening theme is "Feeling Around" by Minori Suzuki, while the ending theme is "Love Men Holic" by Shiena Nishizawa.

Reception
It was reported in March 2017 that the first four volumes of the manga series have sold over 840,000 copies in Japan.

See also
 Meibutsu
 Ramen

Notes

References

External links
Anime series official website 
Drama series official website 

AT-X (TV network) original programming
AXsiZ
Comedy anime and manga
Cooking in anime and manga
Crunchyroll anime
Dark Horse Comics titles
Discotek Media
Fuji TV dramas
Japanese television dramas based on manga
Seinen manga
Studio Gokumi
Takeshobo manga